The following is an incomplete list of works by Clara Peeters that are generally accepted as autograph by the RKD, the art historian Sam Segal and other sources.

The following two similar paintings have the monograph CP and are in the style of Clara Peeters but are listed as anonymous by the RKD, which currently considers the attribution to Peeters rejected.

Sources

External links
 Clara Peeters in the RKD
 84 paintings by or in the style of Clara Peeters in the RKD

Clara Peeters
Peeters